Mihri is a word of Turkish language origin, and it may refer to:

Mihri Pektaş (1895–1979), Turkish school teacher and one of the first 18 female parliament members of Turkey
Mihri Belli (1915–2011),Turkish socialist politician
Mihri Hatun (died 1506), Ottoman female poet
Mihri Müşfik Hanım (1886–c. 1954), Turkish female painter

Turkish given names